Chudá holka is a 1930 silent Czech melodrama film directed by Martin Frič.
Originally a silent film, it was re-released in theatres in 1932 set to music and songs of Jára Beneš.

Cast
 Suzanne Marwille as Marie Růžová
 Blanka Svobodová as Mrs. Rivolová
 Karel Fiala as Miller Bořický
 Antonie Nedošinská as Bořický's wife
 Otto Rubík as JUDr. Klement Bořický
 Josef Rovenský as Alois Mokráček
 Emilie Nitschová as Mokráček's wife
 Eman Fiala as Berka
 Jan W. Speerger as Architekt Robert Jánský
 Ela Poznerová as Věra, Jánský's wife
 Milka Balek-Brodská as Prostitute Tereza
 Josef Šváb-Malostranský as Singer

References

External links
 

1930 films
1930 drama films
Czechoslovak black-and-white films
Czech silent films
Films directed by Martin Frič
Czechoslovak drama films
Silent drama films
1930s Czech films